The Mohammed Yousef El-Najar Hospital is a hospital in Rafah, Gaza Strip, Palestine.

History
The hospital was established in 2000 by transforming the previous center for primary care at the building. On 1 August 2014, the building was attacked by Israel Defense Forces.

Architecture
The hospital spans over an area of 4,000 m2. It has a total of 65 beds and it consists of two operating rooms. The emergency department has a total of 9 beds.

See also
 List of hospitals in the State of Palestine

References

Buildings and structures in the Gaza Strip
Hospitals in the State of Palestine
Rafah Governorate